Deni Lušić (born 14 April 1962 in Split) is a Croatian water polo coach and former water polo player. He is a double Olympic gold medal winner with Yugoslavia at the 1984 and 1988 Summer Olympics.

See also
 Yugoslavia men's Olympic water polo team records and statistics
 List of Olympic champions in men's water polo
 List of Olympic medalists in water polo (men)
 List of world champions in men's water polo
 List of World Aquatics Championships medalists in water polo

References
 
 Deni Lušić

External links
 

1962 births
Living people
Croatian male water polo players
Yugoslav male water polo players
Olympic water polo players of Yugoslavia
Olympic gold medalists for Yugoslavia
Water polo players from Split, Croatia
Water polo players at the 1984 Summer Olympics
Water polo players at the 1988 Summer Olympics
Croatian water polo coaches
Olympic medalists in water polo
Medalists at the 1988 Summer Olympics
Medalists at the 1984 Summer Olympics
World Aquatics Championships medalists in water polo
Mediterranean Games silver medalists for Croatia
Competitors at the 1993 Mediterranean Games
Mediterranean Games medalists in water polo